Andy Fish is a graphic novelist, born Andrew Tiberius Fish, is a comic book artist, illustrator, painter, and educator. He is known for his graphic novels and his series of books on how to illustrate in certain styles.

Early life
Fish was raised by his Mom, sister, two aunts and his maternal grandmother after his father abandoned the family when he was two years old.  This upbringing gave him a "respect" for women and for hard work. 

Fish attended the School of Visual Arts in New York City, doing undergraduate studies in Comic Art and Illustration. At the School of Visual Arts, Fish studied under Will Eisner, a pioneer of the graphic novel medium. At the Rhode Island School of Design he did post-graduate studies in Illustration and Painting.

Career
On November 14, 2018 Entertainment Weekly announced in and Exclusive that ARCHIE COMICS would be relaunching an all ages SABRINA THE TEENAGE WITCH comic book written by Kelly Thompson and illustrated by the husband and wife team of Andy and Veronica Fish.

In February 2018 Dark Horse Comics announced that it would be publishing a new horror/comedy mini series written by Evan Dorkin and illustrated by the husband and wife team of Andy and Veronica Fish.

Blackwood was released on May 30, 2018. Reviewing the book for Geek.com, Insha Fitzpatrick praised Fish's work on the book, writing:

"Andy Fish does all the silent back work for this comics, and it would be a shame if we don’t shout him out for it. He not only helps with color flats but also is an art assist and letterer to the comic. While everything he does for the comic is absolutely stellar, Fish’s lettering and layouts are absolute standouts. Fish's layouts are easy to follow. Every one always builds on top, and they have their own variation and unison to them that builds the story in a suspenseful way. I absolutely love experimental layout where panels are on top of panels and Fish does this amazingly. He provides a space where Veronica’s art can breathe freely, so you soak in every detail. He also does a massively incredible job with lettering this comic. Again, allowing you to follow easily, but gives tons of variations on the balloon placement and sound effects. This is one comic where the sound effects were absolutely effective and essential to be placed perfectly, and Fish nails it."

Fish illustrated a graphic novel written by humorist Steve Altes about high-tech pranks at the Massachusetts Institute of Technology titled Geeks & Greeks. The story was inspired by actual MIT hacks and incidents Altes experienced as an MIT student and fraternity resident. Geeks & Greeks (Relentless Goat Productions, Steve Altes (writer), Andy Fish (illustrator), Veronica Fish (colorist) ) was published in 2016 to generally positive reviews.

Film rights to Geeks & Greeks have been optioned to Whydah Productions.

An ardent fan of actor Adam West, Fish drew The Misadventures of Adam West.

In 2017 Fish launched a vintage Batman comic serial, which comics culture blog 13th Dimension called, "the best Batman comic never published by DC."

Fish has created illustrations for such corporate clients as Warner Bros, DC Comics, Nike, and Coca-Cola and his comics have appeared in Sports Illustrated, The New Yorker and The Boston Globe.

Painting

Fish's work has been exhibited in the Aurora Gallery in Worcester, Massachusetts, the Chashama Gallery in Manhattan, the Ad Hoc Gallery in Brooklyn, and galleries in Sydney, Australia. One of his paintings is in the collection of the National Gallery of Art in Washington, DC. Fish also participated in the 2008 Suckers and Biters Exhibit in Brooklyn.

Teaching
Fish is an Adjunct Professor of Art at Emerson College in Boston. He has also taught at the Worcester Art Museum and the Massachusetts College of Art and Design. Together with his wife fellow artist Veronica Fish, Andy lectures at schools and libraries on the subjects of writing, comics, manga, graphic novels. He also presents programs on how to develop a career as a professional artist.

Awards
 2014 - Boys and Girls Club Lifetime Achievement Honors
 2014 - Pulp Factory Award (nominated)
 2012 - New England Newspaper Association Illustrator Award (nominated)
 2005 - New England Newspaper Association Illustrator Award (nominated)
 2005 - World Smile Celebration Illustration
 2005 - INKY Award for best digital comic book

Personal life
Fish lives in Worcester, MA with his wife and fellow artist Veronica Fish. Andy and Veronica Fish also maintain a studio space in Nagoya, Japan. The two met at The Worcester Art Museum and after years of being friends they were married on a private beach in Wellfleet, Massachusetts. The two artists often work together and travel to various comic book conventions throughout the United States and abroad. Andy has 3 sons from a previous marriage: Matthew, Joseph and Adam.

Bibliography

How to Draw series
Fish is the author and artist of several "how-to" illustration books published by Chartwell Books.
They include:
 2020 - Mastering Perspective, Walter Foster Books, 
 2011 - How To Draw Superheroes, Chartwell Books, 
 2011 - How To Draw Supernatural Beings, Chartwell Books, 
 2010 - How To Draw Graphic Novel Style, Chartwell Books, 
 2010 - How To Draw Tattoo Style, Chartwell Books, (with Veronica Hebard),

Graphic novels and comics 
Fish is the author and artist of the following graphic novels and comics:
 2020 - Sabrina the Teenage Witch; Something Wicked, Archie Comics
 2020 - Blackwood; Mourning After, Dark Horse Comics
 2018 - Sabrina the Teenage Witch, Archie Comics
 2018 - Blackwood, Dark Horse Comics
 2014 - Geeks & Greeks, Relentless Goat Productions, 
 2012 - Dracula's Army, McFarland Press 
 2011 - Dracula: The Dead Travel Fast, Robo Picto Books, 
 2011 - Werewolves of Wisconsin, McFarland Press, 
 2007 - The Tragic Tale of Turkey Boy: An American Love Story, Under Cover Books
 2007 - Fly: A True Story Completely Made Up, Under Cover Books
 2004 - Requiem, 24 Pages in 24 Hours, Blue Monkey Comics
 2004 - Jerry Claus: The Return of Dark Santa, Blue Monkey Comics
 2000 - Adam Bomb vs. the Moon Menace, Blue Monkey Comics
 1999 - Adam Bomb, Blue Monkey Comics
 1997 - Cable, Marshall Comics
 The Misadventures of Adam West: Vol. 5, Blue Water Productions
 Bagman at the World's Fair, Airship 27
 Crimson Mask, Airship 27
 Queen of Escapes, Airship 27

References

External links
Andy Fish - Official Website
Undercover Fish Group

American graphic novelists
American comic strip cartoonists
Emerson College faculty
Year of birth missing (living people)
Rhode Island School of Design alumni
Living people
Novelists from Massachusetts